The Republic of Somaliland Representative Office in Taiwan (Chinese: 索馬利蘭共和國駐台灣代表處); (Somali: Xafiiska Wakiilka Jamhuuriyadda Somaliland ee Taiwan) is the representative office of the Republic of Somaliland in the Republic of China, Taiwan. It is the largest diplomatic mission of Somaliland in the East Asia region and serves Somaliland’s interest in East Asia and Southeast Asia Region. The office was inaugurated on September 9, 2020 in an event held at Institute of Diplomacy and International Affairs (IDIA) in Taipei.

History 

The Republic of Somaliland and the Republic of China (Taiwan) started diplomatic cooperation since 2009 and have gradually evolved into an official diplomatic relationship. Members of Somaliland Ministry of Foreign Affairs and International Cooperation visited Taiwan in late 2019 and early 2020 to discuss establishing official representatives’ offices for both countries in the capital cities Hargeisa and Taipei. The two countries announced an official relationship in July 2020, eventually, Taiwan opened its office in the capital city of Somaliland, Hargeisa. Somaliland representative office was also opened on September 09, 2020, the plaque-unveiling ceremony of the representative office was held at the Ministry of Foreign Affairs Institute of Diplomacy and International Affairs, but the office itself is located on Ningbo West Street in Taipei’s Zhongzheng District. The launching ceremony was co-hosted by H.E. Amb. Mohamed Omar Hagi Mohamoud, Somaliland chief representative to Taiwan, and H.E. Joseph Wu (吳釗燮), the Foreign Minister of Taiwan. The opening ceremony first played prerecorded congratulatory video from the President of Republic of Somaliland H.E. Muse Bihi Abdi, President Bihi commented that “both sides are motivated by a spirit of mutual assistance that will never expose any harm whatsoever to the interests of other countries, but rather contributes to international peace and regional economic activities”.

Embassy sections 
The embassy has currently three sections:

 Political and General Affairs
 Development Cooperation and Cultural Affairs
 Economic and Commercial Affairs

Mission leaders 
The office has both Somaliland and Taiwan staff. Amb Mohamed Omar Hagi Mohamoud is the Representative of Somaliland in Taiwan and the Chief of Mission, he is a Ph.D. researcher in Politics and Philosophy at Manchester Metropolitan University. Other notable staff include the Head of Development and Cultural Affairs, the Head of Economic and Commercial Affairs and the Executive Secretary.

See also 

 Somaliland–Taiwan relations
 List of diplomatic missions in Taiwan
 List of representative offices of Somaliland

References

External links 
 
 
 

2020 establishments in Taiwan
Representative Offices in Taipei
Taiwan
Somaliland–Taiwan relations